The Kenyan cricket team toured Ireland in 2009. They played three One Day Internationals and an Intercontinental Cup match against Ireland.

Intercontinental Cup match

ODI series

1st ODI

2nd ODI

3rd ODI

References

2009 in Irish cricket
Kenyan cricket tours abroad